The Luxembourgish Wikipedia is the Luxembourgish language version of Wikipedia, the free encyclopedia.

References

External links 

Luxembourgish Wikipedia

Wikipedias by language
Wikipedia
Science and technology in Luxembourg